Robert Craig (16 June 1928 – 2016) was an English professional footballer who played as a full-back for Sunderland.

References

1928 births
2016 deaths
Sportspeople from Consett
Footballers from County Durham
English footballers
Association football fullbacks
Sunderland A.F.C. players
Oxford United F.C. players
Bedford Town F.C. players
English Football League players